Snells is an unincorporated community in the town of Neenah, Winnebago County, Wisconsin, United States.

History
Snells was named for a local landowner.

Notes

Unincorporated communities in Winnebago County, Wisconsin
Unincorporated communities in Wisconsin